Maureen O'Sullivan (born 10 March 1951) is a former Irish Independent politician who served as a Teachta Dála (TD) for the Dublin Central constituency from 2009 to 2020.

Early life
A native of Dublin's East Wall, she was educated locally at Mount Carmel school. After completing a BA at University College Dublin, she then went on to work as an English and History teacher and guidance counsellor in a secondary school in Baldoyle, a position she held for 30 years.

Political career
She was a member of Tony Gregory's local political organisation in the 1970s, first canvassing for him and later serving as his election agent. She was co-opted onto Dublin City Council for the North Inner City local electoral area from September 2008 to June 2009, after the retirement of Mick Rafferty. After the death of Tony Gregory, she won the resulting by-election which was held on the same day as the local elections where she also won a seat on Dublin City Council, for the North Inner City local electoral area. Marie Metcalfe was co-opted to take the seat due to the dual mandate rule; subsequently Anna Quigley replaced Metcalfe on Dublin City Council, who was in turn replaced by Mel MacGiobúin in March 2014. MacGiobúin failed to be elected at the local elections held in May.

O'Sullivan was re-elected to the Dáil at the 2011 general election. She joined the Dáil Technical group which gave independents and minor parties more speaking time in Dáil debates.

She described a proposal for political gender quota legislation as "tokenistic" and that women were able to get themselves nominated for election.

In December 2015, Maureen O'Sullivan and fellow independent TDs Clare Daly and Mick Wallace each put forward offers of a €5,000 surety for a 23-year-old man being prosecuted under terrorism legislation in the Special Criminal Court in Dublin charged with membership of an illegal dissident republican terrorist organisation.

After the 2016 general election she unsuccessfully stood for election as Ceann Comhairle. She joined a technical group aligned with Independents 4 Change, while remaining outside the Independents 4 Change party. O'Sullivan was criticised by the brother of late TD Tony Gregory, over an allegedly false claim made in her election literature.

On 16 January 2020, O'Sullivan announced she would not be standing in the February 2020 general election.

References

External links

1951 births
Living people
Alumni of University College Dublin
Independent TDs
Irish schoolteachers
Local councillors in Dublin (city)
Members of the 30th Dáil
Members of the 31st Dáil
Members of the 32nd Dáil
21st-century women Teachtaí Dála
Politicians from County Dublin